Luis Serra (12 October 1935 – 2 October 1992) was a Uruguayan cyclist. He competed at the 1952, 1956 and 1960 Summer Olympics.

References

1935 births
1992 deaths
Uruguayan male cyclists
Olympic cyclists of Uruguay
Cyclists at the 1952 Summer Olympics
Cyclists at the 1956 Summer Olympics
Cyclists at the 1960 Summer Olympics
Pan American Games medalists in cycling
Pan American Games gold medalists for Uruguay
Pan American Games silver medalists for Uruguay
Pan American Games bronze medalists for Uruguay
Cyclists at the 1955 Pan American Games
Medalists at the 1955 Pan American Games